El Palo Fútbol Club is a Spanish football team based in Málaga, in the autonomous community of Andalusia. Founded in 1971 it currently plays in Tercera División – Group 9, holding home matches at Estadio San Ignacio, with a 2,000-seat capacity.

History

The club was founded in 1971 as Centro de Deportes El Palo. On October 20, 2017 Juan Francisco Funes became a new head coach of the club. On 3 July 2019, the club changed its name to El Palo Fútbol Club.

Season to season

2 seasons in Segunda División B
13 seasons in Tercera División

Current squad

Former players
 Jaume Doménech
 Ángel Guirado

References

External links
Official website
Futbolme team profile 

Football clubs in Andalusia
Association football clubs established in 1972
1972 establishments in Spain
Sport in Málaga